The 2012 FIM Gorzow Speedway Grand Prix of Poland was the sixth race of the 2012 Speedway Grand Prix season. It took place on June 23 at the Edward Jancarz Stadium in Gorzów Wielkopolski, Poland.

The Grand Prix was won by Martin Vaculík who beat Chris Harris, wild card Bartosz Zmarzlik and Tomasz Gollob. Vaculík becoming first Slovak rider who ride in the SGP and third rider who won SGP event in his debut (after Tomasz Gollob and Emil Sayfutdinov). It was 150th SPG event since 1995 and Greg Hancock was only rider who rode in all meetings.

Riders 
The Speedway Grand Prix Commission nominated Bartosz Zmarzlik as Wild Card, and Piotr and Przemysław Pawlicki both as Track Reserves. Injured Jarosław Hampel was replaced by first Qualified Substitutes, Martin Vaculík. The draw was made on June 22.
 (3)  Jarosław Hampel → (19)  Martin Vaculík

Heat details

Heat after heat 
 (61,81) Ljung, Lindgren, Lindbäck, Harris
 (61,60) Vaculík, Zmarzlik, Gollob, Bjerre
 (62,31) Crump, Holder, Hancock, Sayfutdinov
 (62,41) Jonsson, N. Pedersen, B. Pedersen, Andersen
 (62,75) Hancock, Vaculík, Ljung, Jonsson
 (63,01) Lindgren, Holder, Gollob, B. Pedersen
 (63,14) N. Pedersen, Sayfutdinov, Zmarzlik, Harris (R)
 (63,11) Lindbäck, Andersen, Bjerre, Crump (X)
 (63,33) Andersen, Sayfutdinov, Gollob, Ljung
 (63,94) Lindgren, Vaculík, N. Pedersen, Crump
 (63,97) Hancock, B. Pedersen, Harris, Bjerre
 (64,13) Zmarzlik, Jonsson, Holder, Lindbäck
 (64,19) Ljung, Zmarzlik, B. Pedersen, Crump
 (63,78) Sayfutdinov, Jonsson, Lindgren, Bjerre
 (64,34) Holder, Vaculík, Andersen, Harris (R)
 (64,12) Gollob, Hancock, Lindbäck, N. Pedersen
 (65,06) Holder, Bjerre, N. Pedersen, Ljung
 (64,72) Hancock, Lindgren, Andersen, Zmarzlik
 (64,34) Gollob, Crump, Jonsson, Harris
 (64,22) Vaculík, Sayfutdinov, Lindbäck, B. Pedersen
 Semifinals
 (64,23) Zmarzlik, Holder, Sayfutdinov, Hancock (R)
 (64,34) Gollob, Vaculík, Jonsson, Lindgren
 Final
 (66,87) Vaculík, Holder, Zmarzlik, Gollob

The intermediate classification

References

See also 
 motorcycle speedway

Speedway Grand Prix of Poland
Poland
2012
Sport in Gorzów Wielkopolski